The IG postcode area, also known as the Ilford postcode area, is a group of eleven postcode districts in England, within six post towns. These cover parts of eastern Greater London and south-west Essex. Inward mail for the area is sorted, along with mail for the E and RM postcode areas, at the Romford Mail Centre.

The area served includes much of the London Borough of Redbridge, the western part of the London Borough of Barking and Dagenham, and the southwestern part of the Epping Forest district of Essex, while the western part of IG8 and IG11 covers a small part of the London Borough of Waltham Forest, and the London Borough of Newham.

The area uses "IG" rather than "IL", as the latter could be misread as "LL" or "L1". The "G" is derived from the final letter of the adjacent postal town Barking, a feature shared with the SM postcode area, where the chosen letters also appear to combine the names of two neighbouring places.



Coverage
The approximate coverage of the postcode districts:

! IG1
| ILFORD
| Ilford, Cranbrook, Loxford (part)
| Redbridge
|-
! IG2
| ILFORD
| Gants Hill, Newbury Park, Aldborough Hatch
| Redbridge
|-
! IG3
| ILFORD
| Seven Kings, Goodmayes
| Redbridge
|-
! IG4
| ILFORD
| Redbridge
| Redbridge
|-
! IG5
| ILFORD
| Clayhall
| Redbridge
|-
! IG6
| ILFORD
| Barkingside, Fullwell Cross, Hainault (south), Fairlop
| Redbridge
|-
! IG7
| CHIGWELL *
| Chigwell, Chigwell Row, Hainault (north)
| Epping Forest, Redbridge
|-
! IG8
| WOODFORD GREEN
| Woodford Green, Woodford Bridge, Highams Park (part)
| Redbridge,  Waltham Forest
|-
! IG9
| BUCKHURST HILL *
| Buckhurst Hill
| Epping Forest
|-
! IG10
| LOUGHTON
| Loughton, High Beach (part)
| Epping Forest
|-
! IG11
| BARKING
| Barking, Barking Riverside, Beckton (part), Creekmouth, Loxford (part), Thames View, Upney
| Barking and Dagenham, Newham, Redbridge
|}

* covered by Woodford Green Royal Mail Delivery Office

Ilford campaign

In 2005, a local businessman named Wilson Chowdhry led a campaign for Ilford's IG1 postcode to be changed to E19. Although Ilford has been part of Greater London since 1965, it is not within the London post town. Chowdhry argued that the IG1 postcode confused customers, and that a London E postcode would help bring more business into Ilford. However, a Royal Mail spokesman said that the campaign had "virtually no hope" of succeeding, as postcodes are only changed for operational reasons.

A similar plea had been raised in the 1970s by Greater London Council politician Serge Lourie, and similarly rejected. Ilford had been part of the original E division of the London postal district from 1857 until 1866.

Map

See also
Postcode Address File
List of postcode areas in the United Kingdom

References

External links
Royal Mail's Postcode Address File
A quick introduction to Royal Mail's Postcode Address File (PAF)

Postcode areas covering London
Postcode areas covering the East of England
Media and communications in the London Borough of Barking and Dagenham
Media and communications in the London Borough of Redbridge
Epping Forest District